Sara Ramírez Bermúdez (born September 4, 1987) is a Spanish table tennis player. She was born in Ripollet.

As of July 2012 her rank is 29th in Europe and 83rd in the world.

She competed for Spain in Women's singles and Women's team Table Tennis at the 2012 Summer Olympics.

References

External links
 
 
 
 
 
 

1987 births
Living people
Spanish female table tennis players
Olympic table tennis players of Spain
Table tennis players at the 2012 Summer Olympics
Mediterranean Games gold medalists for Spain
Mediterranean Games silver medalists for Spain
Competitors at the 2013 Mediterranean Games
Mediterranean Games medalists in table tennis
Universiade bronze medalists for Spain
Universiade medalists in table tennis
21st-century Spanish women